Insidious is a series of American horror films created by Leigh Whannell. The films in the franchise include, Insidious (2010), Insidious: Chapter 2 (2013), Insidious: Chapter 3 (2015), Insidious: The Last Key (2018) and Insidious: Fear the Dark (2023). The films have grossed over $542million worldwide on a combined budget of $26.5million.

The first two films were directed by James Wan, the third by Whannell, who also served as the screenwriter for all four films. Adam Robitel directed the fourth installment. Patrick Wilson directed the fifth installment. FilmDistrict released the first and second films, while Focus Features, Universal Pictures, Sony Pictures Releasing handled the third, fourth and fifth, respectively.

The first two films center on a couple who, after their son mysteriously enters a comatose state and becomes a vessel for ghosts in an astral plane, are continuously haunted by demons from a forbidden realm known as the Further until they take from the family what they want most: life. The third film, a prequel, focuses on the same psychic who helped the family; this time she comes to the aid of a young girl who calls out to the dead, the fourth film follows her when her own family becomes haunted. The fifth film, follows their son Dalton going to college and gets haunted by a presence of his past. The  first four film plots are depicted as case files of demonologists, and focuses on people who unwillingly make contact with the demonic world, with the fifth centering on a teenage Dalton who goes to college and gets haunted by a presence of his past.

Films

Insidious (2010)

Insidious was directed by James Wan, written by Leigh Whannell, and starred Patrick Wilson, Rose Byrne and Barbara Hershey. The story centers on a couple whose son inexplicably enters a comatose state and becomes a vessel for ghosts in an astral dimension. The film had its world premiere on September 14, 2010, at the 2010 Toronto International Film Festival (TIFF) and was released in theaters on April 1, 2011, and is FilmDistrict's first theatrical release. A sequel, Insidious: Chapter 2, was released on September 13, 2013, with Wan returning as director and Whannell returning as screenwriter. The film's success led to it being used as inspiration for a maze in Universal's 2013 Halloween Horror Nights.

Insidious: Chapter 2 (2013)

Insidious: Chapter 2 was also directed by Wan and written by Whannell. The film stars Wilson and Byrne reprising their roles as Josh and Renai Lambert, a husband and wife who seek to uncover the secret that has left them dangerously connected to the spirit world. The film was released on September 13, 2013. It was a box-office success, grossing over $161million worldwide, but received mixed reviews.

Insidious: Chapter 3 (2015)

Insidious: Chapter 3 is the third film in the series, written and directed by Whannell. The film is a prequel to the haunting of the Lambert family in the first two films, and stars Stefanie Scott, Dermot Mulroney, Lin Shaye, and Whannell. The plot follows a girl—Quinn—who is haunted by a demon after trying to call out to her mother Lillith, who died. It was released on June 5, 2015.

Insidious: The Last Key (2018)

Prior to the release of Insidious: Chapter 3, Whannell was asked, "If there is a Insidious: Chapter 4, would that be a sequel to Chapter 3, another prequel to the original or will it continue in this timeline or go to a whole new timeline?" Whannell replied:  On May 16, 2016, it was announced that Chapter 4 would have an October 20, 2017 release date with Whannell writing, Jason Blum, Oren Peli and Wan producing, Adam Robitel directing, and Shaye returning to reprise her role as Elise Rainier. The plot centered on the Rainier haunting, after a young Elise opened a forbidden red door and unwillingly allowed a extremely dangerous spirit known as the Key Demon to enter the human world. On October 11, 2016, the film was given a new release date of January 5, 2018.

Insidious: Fear the Dark (2023)

In October 2020, it was announced that a direct sequel to The Last Key was in development. Patrick Wilson will serve as director in addition to reprising his starring role, while Scott Teems serves as screenwriter, based on an original story by Leigh Whannell. The premise will center around a now-grown Dalton Lambert as he goes off to college, but the nasty demons of his past return to tear Dalton's college trip apart, with Ty Simpkins reprising the role. Rose Byrne has also been confirmed to reprise her role as Renai Lambert. Jason Blum, James Wan, Leigh Whannell, and Oren Peli will serve as producers. The project will be produced by Blumhouse Productions and distributed by Sony Pictures. It is scheduled for a July 7, 2023 release.

Potential crossover
In January 2018 during a press interview for The Last Key, Jason Blum stated that a crossover film between Insidious and Sinister had previously been in development, tentatively entitled Insinister. He stated that he personally believed it had potential for re-entering development in the future, stating that "we're going to cross our worlds at some point... We're going to try."

Recurring cast and characters

Additional crew and production details

Reception

Box office performance

Critical and public response

See also
 List of ghost films

References

External links
 
 
 
 
 

 
Film series introduced in 2010
American supernatural horror films
Films shot in California
American haunted house films
American independent films
FilmDistrict films
Universal Pictures films
IM Global films
Stage 6 Films films
Stage 6 Films franchises
Focus Features films
Alliance Films films
Entertainment One films
Films about spirit possession
Horror film series
2010s English-language films
2020s English-language films